FrieslandCampina Engro Pakistan Limited (FCEPL) is a Pakistani dairy products company which is a subsidiary of Dutch multinational cooperative FrieslandCampina. It is based in Karachi, Pakistan.

FrieslandCampina Engro Pakistan produces products such as dairy, ice cream, and frozen desserts. The company also operates a dairy farm.

Brands 
 Olper's
 Olper's Lite
 Omoré (frozen dessert)
 Dairy Omung
 Omung Lassi
 Tarang

History
The company was founded as a subsidiary of Engro Corporation in 2005. The company was still struggling to fully reach consumers due to its weak supply chain.

This company intends to expand its reach in Pakistan and, in future, access some Central Asian markets. FrieslandCampina already has operations in Mozambique, Sri Lanka, Singapore, Guinea, Libya and the United Arab Emirates.

In July 2019, the company changed its name to FrieslandCampina Engro Pakistan.

In 2016, Pakistan was the third-largest milk producing country in the world with an annual production of 38 billion litres of milk. Engro Foods is expected to take advantage of the current trend of market's conversion from loose to packaged dairy products.

Plants
The company operates two processing plants in the following cities of Pakistan:
 Sukkur
 Sahiwal

References

2016 mergers and acquisitions
Companies listed on the Pakistan Stock Exchange
Dairy products companies of Pakistan
Engro Corporation
Food and drink companies established in 2005
FrieslandCampina subsidiaries
Food and drink companies based in Karachi
Manufacturing companies based in Karachi
Mergers and acquisitions of Pakistani companies
Pakistani companies established in 2005
Pakistani subsidiaries of foreign companies
Sahiwal
Sukkur